is a city and port located in Iburi Subprefecture, Hokkaido, Japan. It is the capital city of Iburi Subprefecture.

History 
The origin of Muroran's name is derived from the Ainu word "Mo Ruerani", which means "the bottom of a little slope". The little slope, in front of the former Senkai Temple in Sakimori-cho, is noted in connection with the name of Muroran.

In the late 16th century, the Muroran region came under the administration of the Matsumae clan. Muroran was developed as a trading post between the Ainu and the Matsumae clan people.

In 1892, the Port of Muroran was opened for the wooden bridge construction at Kaigan (former Tokikaramoi); at the same time, the main road began construction from Hakodate to Sapporo as the first step of Hokkaido Colonization Plan.

An Imperial decree in July 1899 established Muroran as an open port for trading with the United States and the United Kingdom.

With the opening of a ship route from Muroran to Mori and railroad extension to Iwamizawa, Muroran's municipality was started on August 1, 1922 as the core of the major land and sea traffic in the pioneer era of Hokkaido. Since then, Muroran has been developing as an important transportation hub and a center of the steel industry. This unfortunately earned the town's industrial plants a bombardment by some of the newest American battleships in July 1945, in the closing days of World War II. Muroran was also bombed by American naval aircraft on 14 and 15 July 1945, 525 people were killed.

Today, there are large cement factories, steel mills, oil refineries, and shipyards clustered around the port of Muroran.

Climate
Muroran features a warm-summer humid continental climate (Köppen climate classification Dfb—Cfb if the  isotherm is used), a climate type that is very rare in Japan. Summers in Muroran are mild by Japanese standards, not nearly as hot as summers in other Japanese cities.

Scenic spots 
 Hakucho Bridge spans the Port of Muroran and is the largest suspension bridge in eastern Japan.
 Mount Washibetsu
 Itanki Beach

Muroran holds eight specific scenic sights called .

Transportation 
There are five JR Hokkaido stations in Muroran, starting from Higashi Muroran and ending in downtown Muroran, which can be used to access both Hakodate to the South West, and Sapporo to the North East.
 Muroran Main Line : Sakimori - Moto-Wanishi - Higashi-Muroran
 Muroran Branch Line : Higashi-Muroran - Wanishi - Misaki - Bokoi - Muroran

Economy 
Japan Steel Works has its global headquarters in Muroran.

Education 
Muroran houses one of the most prominent Marine Biology institutes in Japan, the Institute of Algological Research of Hokkaido University.

Universities
 Muroran Institute of Technology

High schools

Public
 Hokkaido Muroran Sakae High School
 Hokkaido Muroran Shimizugaoka High School
 Hokkaido Muroran Tosho High School
 Hokkaido Muroran Technical High School

Private
 Hokkaido Ootani Muroran High School
 Kaisei Gakuin High School

Notable people
 Ikuta Toma - Actor, singer
 Natsumi Abe - idol, singer, actress. Hello! Project soloist. former Morning Musume member.
 Asami Abe - singer, actress. Younger sister of Natsumi Abe.
 Kaori Iida - singer. Hello! Project soloist. former Morning Musume member.
 Satoru Iwata - Previous CEO of Nintendo, Former HAL lab CEO and Game Designer

Twin towns and sister cities
 Shizuoka, Shizuoka, since 1976
 Knoxville, Tennessee, since 1991
 Joetsu, Niigata, since 1995

References

External links

Official Website 

 
Cities in Hokkaido
Port settlements in Japan
Populated coastal places in Japan
Empire of Japan
Japan campaign